Brigadier Kuldip Singh Chandpuri MVC, VSM (22 November 1940 – 17 November 2018) was a decorated Indian Army officer. He is known for his leadership in the Battle of Longewala during the Indo-Pakistani War of 1971, for which he was awarded the Maha Vir Chakra, the second highest Indian military decoration, by the Indian government. The 1997 Hindi film Border was based on the battle, with his role played by Sunny Deol. He was a councillor in the Chandigarh Municipal Corporation from 2006 to 2011.

Early life
Kuldip Singh Chandpuri was born on 22 November 1940 in a Sikh family in Montgomery, Punjab, British India (now in Punjab, Pakistan). His family then moved to their native village, Chandpur Rurki, in Balachaur. He was an active member of the NCC and cleared the NCC examination when he graduated from the Government College, Hoshiarpur in 1962. Chandpuri was the third generation in his family who have served in the Indian Army as officers. Both his younger uncles were flying officers in the Indian Air Force. Chandpuri was the only child of his parents.

Career
In 1963, Chandpuri was commissioned from the Officers Training Academy, Chennai into the 3rd battalion, Punjab Regiment (3rd Punjab), which is one of the oldest and one of the most highly decorated regiments of the Indian Army. He took part in the Indo-Pakistani War of 1965 in the western sector. After the war, he served in the United Nations Emergency Force (UNEF) in Gaza (Egypt) for a year. He also served twice as an instructor at the prestigious Infantry School in Mhow, Madhya Pradesh.

Battle of Longewala
Kuldip Singh Chandpuri was a major in 23 Punjab when the Pakistan Army attacked the Longewala post in Rajasthan, India, early in the Indo-Pakistani War of 1971. Chandpuri and his company of 120 soldiers defended the post, in spite of considerable odds, against the 2000-3000 strong assault force of the Pakistani 51st Infantry Brigade, backed by the 22nd Armored Regiment. Chandpuri and his company held the Pakistanis at bay for a full night until the Indian Air Force arrived to provide air support in the morning.

Chandpuri inspired his men, moving from bunker to bunker, encouraging them to beat back the enemy until reinforcements arrived. Chandpuri and his men inflicted heavy casualties on the enemy and forced them to retreat, leaving behind twelve tanks. For his conspicuous gallantry and leadership, Chandpuri was awarded the Maha Vir Chakra (MVC) by the government of India.

Chandpuri retired from the army as a brigadier.

Maha Vir Chakra Citation
The citation for Chandpuri's Maha Vir Chakra award reads as follows:

In popular culture
 Border, a 1997 Hindi film directed by J.P.Dutta was an adaptation of the real-life battle, with Major Chandpuri being portrayed by Hindi film actor Sunny Deol.

Death 
On 17 November 2018, Chandpuri died at the Fortis Hospital, Mohali due to cancer, at the age of 77, five days before his 78th birthday. He was survived by three sons.

Military awards and decorations

Dates of rank

References

External links
 Picture, Kuldip Singh Chandpuri (3rd from left) with his company
 MVC citations, Sikh Personalities

1940 births
2018 deaths
Military leaders of the Indo-Pakistani War of 1971
Punjabi people
Indian Sikhs
Sikh warriors
Indian Army officers
Military personnel from Punjab, India
Recipients of the Vishisht Seva Medal
Recipients of the Maha Vir Chakra
People from Shaheed Bhagat Singh Nagar district